Vice Admiral Sir Geoffrey Barnard  & Bar (12 November 1902 – 19 December 1974) was a Royal Navy officer who became Deputy Chief of the Naval Staff.

Naval career
Barnard joined the Royal Navy in 1916 during the First World War, and subsequently specialised in Gunnery. He was given command of the destroyer  in 1935.

He served in the Second World War as Fleet Gunnery Officer and Deputy Chief of Staff to the Commander-in-Chief, Mediterranean Fleet, earning the Distinguished Service Order (DSO) at the Battle of Cape Matapan in March 1941, and seeing action at the landings in North Africa in 1942. He took command of the cruiser  in 1944, and was awarded a Bar to his DSO during Operation Dragoon in 1945.

After the War he became Chief Staff Officer to the Flag Officer (Air) in 1946 and Director of the Royal Navy Tactical School in 1948. He was attached to the Indian Navy and commanded the Indian Navy Squadron from 1950 before being appointed Assistant Chief of the Naval Staff (Warfare) in 1952. He became Deputy Chief of the Naval Staff and a Lord Commissioner of the Admiralty in 1953 and Naval Attaché at the Joint Services Mission in Washington D. C. in 1954. His last role was as President of the Royal Naval College, Greenwich, in 1956 before retiring in 1959.

Family
In 1926 he married Julyan Frances Crawley; they had one son and two daughters.

References

|-

|-

|-

1902 births
1974 deaths
Admiral presidents of the Royal Naval College, Greenwich
Commanders of the Order of the British Empire
Companions of the Distinguished Service Order
Knights Commander of the Order of the Bath
Recipients of the Legion of Honour
Lords of the Admiralty
Recipients of the Croix de Guerre 1939–1945 (France)
Royal Navy vice admirals
Royal Navy officers of World War I
Royal Navy officers of World War II
Military personnel from London